In Mexico, queso Chihuahua is commonly recognized as a soft white cheese available in braids, balls or rounds and originates in the Mexican state of Chihuahua. In Chihuahua, it is called queso menonita, after the Mennonite communities of northern Mexico that first produced it, while elsewhere it is called queso Chihuahua. This cheese is now made by both Mennonites and non-Mennonites throughout the state and is popular all over the country.

Queso Chihuahua is good for melting and is similar to a mild, white Cheddar or Monterey Jack.  It may be used in queso fundido (fondue style melted cheese), choriqueso, quesadillas, chilaquiles, chili con queso, or sauces. Both Chihuahua cheese and the Chihuahua breed of dogs derive their names from the Chihuahua region, but they are otherwise unrelated. The physicochemical specifications for Chihuahua cheese are 45% maximum moisture, 26% minimum butterfat, 22% minimum milk protein, 55% minimum total solids, 6.5% maximum ash, and a pH of 5.0 to 5.5.

See also 
 List of cheeses
 Cheeses of Mexico

References 

Chihuahua (state)
Mexican cheeses
Mexican cuisine
Mennonite cuisine
Mennonitism in Mexico